Timothy Parsons may refer to:
 Timothy Parsons (sailor), Hong Kong sailor
 Timothy R. Parsons, Canadian oceanographer